Giuseppe Dermon (born 27 November 1945) is a Swiss cross-country skier. He competed in the men's 50 kilometre event at the 1972 Winter Olympics.

References

1945 births
Living people
Swiss male cross-country skiers
Olympic cross-country skiers of Switzerland
Cross-country skiers at the 1972 Winter Olympics
Place of birth missing (living people)